Pedro Almíndez Chirino (or Pedro Almíndez Chirinos) was a conquistador born in Úbeda and member of several councils that governed New Spain while Hernán Cortés was traveling to Honduras, in 1525-26. Almíndez was an ally of Gonzalo de Salazar; the events of this period are recounted in that article.

In 1530 he was sent by Nuño Beltrán de Guzmán to the current Mexican states of Jalisco, Aguascalientes, Zacatecas and Sinaloa to explore the region, search for gold and silver, and subdue the Indians. He passed through the current town of Lagos de Moreno, Jalisco in March 1530 with a force of 50 Spanish soldiers and 500 Purépecha and Tlaxcaltec allies. This encounter was peaceful, but he was accused of a massacre in Mocorito (Sinaloa) in 1531, and in many places of destroying and burning everything he passed. "Mocorito" in the Cahita language signifies the place of the dead. The indigenous people named it for the Indians that Pedro Almíndez Chirino killed.

See also

 

Spanish conquistadors
Spanish explorers
Year of birth missing
16th-century deaths
Andalusian conquistadors
People of New Spain
Spanish colonial governors and administrators
1525 in New Spain
1526 in New Spain
1530 in New Spain
People from Úbeda
16th-century explorers
16th-century Mexican people
16th-century Spanish people